Rob Cavallo is an Oscar, Golden Globe and multiple Grammy winning music producer. This is a list compiling his production discography.

Partial production discography

Goo Goo Dolls

2013 – Magnetic ("Last Hot Night")
2006 – Let Love In ("Give a Little Bit")
2004 – Live in Buffalo: July 4th, 2004 ("Give a Little Bit")
2002 – Gutterflower
2001 – Ego, Opinion, Art & Commerce
1998 – Dizzy Up the Girl
1998 – "Iris" from the City of Angels soundtrack
1995 – "Wait for the Blackout" from Tommy Boy soundtrack
1995 – A Boy Named Goo ("Disconnected", "Slave Girl")

Green Day
2012 – ¡Tré!
2012 – ¡Dos!
2012 – ¡Uno!
2005 – Bullet in a Bible
2004 – American Idiot
2002 – Shenanigans
2001 – International Superhits!
2000 – Warning (Executive producer)
1998 – "Brain Stew" from Godzilla: The Album
1997 – Nimrod
1997 – "Tired of Waiting" from Private Parts: The Album
1995 – Insomniac
1995 – "J.A.R." from the Angus soundtrack
1994 – Dookie (producer)

My Chemical Romance

2010 – Danger Days: The True Lives of the Fabulous Killjoys
2006 – The Black Parade

Avril Lavigne

2007 – The Best Damn Thing

Paramore

2011 – "Monster" from Transformers: Dark of the Moon – The Album and Singles Club
2009 – Brand New Eyes
2008 – "Decode" from Twilight: Original Motion Picture Soundtrack

Linkin Park
2014 – The Hunting Party (as A&R representative on the album and co-producer on "Wastelands") 
2014 – A Light That Never Comes (Remixes) (as A&R representative)
2013 – Recharged (as A&R representative)
2012 – Living Things (as A&R representative)

Film soundtracks

2014 – Mall
2011 – Transformers: Dark of the Moon – The Album
2009 – 2012
2009 – I Love You, Beth Cooper
2008 – Twilight
2005 – Rent
2003 – Brother Bear
2002 – Treasure Planet
2001 – The Princess Diaries
2001 – Driven
2001 – The Wedding Planner
1999 – Varsity Blues
1999 – Runaway Bride
1999 – Detroit Rock City
1999 – Tarzan
1999 – The Other Sister
1998 – City of Angels
1998 – Godzilla
1997 – Private Parts
1995 – Angus
1995 – Clueless
1995 – National Lampoon's Senior Trip
1995 – Tommy Boy
1984 – Purple Rain

Other projects
 2022 – "Luxury Disease" – One Ok Rock
 2017 – "Come Over When You're Sober Pt 1" – Lil Peep
2013 – "If I Loved You" – Delta Rae
2013 – All That Echoes – Josh Groban
2013 – Heartthrob – Tegan and Sara
2012 – Blak and Blu – Gary Clark, Jr.
2012 – Control – The Indecent
2012 – Matt Toka – Matt Toka
2012 – Into the Wild: EP – LP
2012 – Amaryllis – Shinedown
2012 – The Bright Lights: EP – Gary Clark Jr.
2011 – 2011 Grammy Nominees
2011 – American Idol: 10th Anniversary: The Hits, Vol. 1
2011 – The Essential Ballads
2011 – People and Things – Jack's Mannequin
2010 – Some Kind of Trouble – James Blunt
2010 – Hang Cool Teddy Bear – Meatloaf
2010 – Foxy Shazam – Foxy Shazam
2010 – 2010 Grammy Nominees
2010 – Country Heat 2011
2010 – Happy Hour: The South River Road Sessions – Uncle Kracker
2010 – Top Ten – Sixpence None the Richer
2009 – For Your Entertainment – Adam Lambert
2009 – "Time for Miracles" – Adam Lambert
2009 – "Mess of Me" – Switchfoot
2009 – Happy Hour – Uncle Kracker
2009 – "Lovesick" – 78 Violet (feat. ALY & AJ)
2009 – "Violet Columbus" – Forget Me
2009 – Big Whiskey & the GrooGrux King – Dave Matthews Band
2009 – "Second Chance" – Shinedown
2009 – Twilight Ultimate Gift Set
2008 – "All Summer Long" – Kid Rock
2008 – "Coming to Terms" – Carolina Liar
2008 – Disney Greatest Love Songs
2008 – Now That's What I Call Music!, Vol. 71
2008 – Revolutions in Sound: Warner Bros. Records – The First 50 Years
2008 – Shattered (Turn the Car Around) – O.A.R.
2008 – David Cook – David Cook
2008 – Gift of Screws – Lindsey Buckingham
2008 – Greatest Hits – Dave Koz
2008 – All Sides – O.A.R.
2008 – The Sound of Madness – Shinedown
2007 – Rock N Roll Jesus – Kid Rock
2007 – Happiness Ltd. – Hot Hot Heat
2007 – "I'm Still Here (Jim's Theme) – John Rzeznik
2007 – CBGB Forever
2007 – Give US Your Poor
2007 – Let Me In, Pt. 1 – Hot Hot Heat
2007 – Thrivemix, Vol. 3: Mixed by DJ Skribble and Vic Latino
2006 – "Again and Again" – Jewel
2006 – Festival 06
2006 – Grammy Nominees 2006
2006 – Rent: Seasons of Love
2006 – Rent: Take Me or Leave Me
2006 – Thrivemix, Vol. 2: Mixed by Vic Latino
2006 – Under the Skin – Lindsey Buckingham
2006 – Paris – Paris Hilton
2006 – Goodbye Alice in Wonderland – Jewel
2005 – The Collection – Alanis Morissette
2005 – I'm Not Your Girl – Lalaine
2005 – Room Noises – Eisley
2005 – Disney Wishes!
2005 – Golden Slumbers: A Father's Love
2005 – Grammy Nominees 2005
2005 – Hear Music XM Radio Sessions, Vol. 1
2005 – Whatever: The 90's Pop and Culture Box
2004 – Love Songs: A Compilation... Old and New – Phil Collins
2004 – Oh! From the Girls
2004 – The Best of Sixpence None the Richer
2004 – Walt Disney Records Presents Superstar Hits
2004 – Trouble – Bonnie McKee
2004 – B is for B-Sides – Less Than Jake
2003 – Just So You Know/Mannequins – Holly Palmer
2003 – "Look Through My Eyes" from Brother Bear: Original Motion Picture Soundtrack – Phil Collins
2003 – Perfect Change – Dakona
2003 – Are You Happy Now? – Michelle Branch
2003 – Anthem – Less Than Jake
2003 – Say You Will – Fleetwood Mac
2003 – My Degeneration – Flashlight Brown
2003 – To Whom It May Concern – Lisa Marie Presley
2003 – Edge of a Girl – Alexandra Slate
2003 – Don't Dream It's Over/Kiss Me – Sixpence None the Richer
2003 – Smallville: The Talon Mix
2002 – Disney' Superstar Hits
2002 – Etc. – Jawbreaker
2002 – Lost Angel – 3rd Strike
2002 – Simply the Best Movie Album
2002 – Totally Hits 2002: More Platinum Hits
2002 – Divine Discontent – Sixpence None the Richer
2002 – Testify – Phil Collins
2002 – Into Your Head – BBMak
2002 – "I'm Gonna Love You (Madeline's Theme)" from The Hunchback of Notre Dame II – Jennifer Love Hewitt
2001 – Weird Revolution – Butthole Surfers
2001 – "Miss You More" from Princess Diaries: Official Soundtrack – BBMak
2001 – BlowBack – Tricky
2001 – Leroy – Leroy
2001 – MTV 20: Pop
2001 – The Box Set – KISS
2001 – Unplugged/Clapton Chronicles: The Best of Eric Clapton – Eric Clapton
2000 – Sooner or Later – BBMak
2000 – Best of L7: The Slash Years – L7
2000 – Disney's Greatest Hits
2000 – Hamburger – The Muffs
2000 – Key of a Minor – Jessica Riddle
2000 – Take 2 – Green Day
2000 – Tsar – Tsar
1999 – "Blue Eyes Blue" from Clapton Chronicles: The Best of Eric Clapton – Eric Clapton and the Runaway Bride official soundtrack
1999 – "Nothing Can Keep Me From You" from Detroit Rock City: Official Soundtrack – KISS
1999 – Tarzan: Official Soundtrack – Phil Collins
1999 – Jump Start – Simon Says
1999 – "Loving You Is All I Know" from The Other Sister official soundtrack – The Pretenders
1999 – 1999 Grammy Nominees: Mainstream (Producer)
1998 – Speak of the Devil – Chris Isaak
1997 – The Fourth World – Kara's Flowers (later renamed Maroon 5)
1997 – The Beauty Process: Triple Platinum – L7
1997 – Generations, Vol. 1: A Punk Look at Human Rights
1997 – More Bounce to the Ounce
1997 – Soap Disco – Kara's Flowers (later renamed Maroon 5)
1996 – Buy-Product 2: Brief Encounters
1996 – Jabberjaw Compilation, Vol 2.: Pure Sweet Hell
1995 – Dear You – Jawbreaker
1995 – "You Gave Your Love To Me Softly" from the Angus soundtrack – Weezer
1995 – "Enough" from the Angus soundtrack – Dance Hall Crashers
1995 – Blonder and Blonder – The Muffs
1995 – Lockjaw – Dance Hall Crashers
1992 – American Man – Power Trio from Hell
1985 – Prince & the Revolution: Live

References

Production discographies
Discographies of American artists
Rock music discographies
Pop music discographies